Blood vessel epicardial substance (BVES) also known as popeye domain-containing protein 1 (POPDC1) is a protein that in humans is encoded by the BVES gene.

Bves is a highly conserved, transmembrane protein that is involved in cell adhesion, cell motility, and most recently has been shown to play a role in vesicular transport. Bves is found in a wide variety of organisms (from flies to humans) and is a member of the evolutionarily conserved Popdc family of proteins. Although the precise molecular function of Bves is unknown, disruption of this protein results in developmental defects and impaired cellular processes fundamental to living organisms.

Discovery
Bves was discovered simultaneously by two independent labs in 1999 (Bves was also named Popdc1 at the time of discovery; the current accepted convention is Bves). Although initially isolated from cardiac tissue, it was later revealed that Bves is highly expressed in muscle, epithelial and brain tissue. Most studies have focused on determining the function of Bves in epithelial tissue at the cellular level.

Gene family
Bves is the most studied member of the Popeye domain containing (Popdc) family of genes. The two other members of this family are Popdc2 and Popdc3. Popdc2 and Popdc3 are only found in higher vertebrates and share 50% of their DNA sequence, whereas Bves is only 25% homologous with the evolutionary younger Popdc family members. All three members of the Popdc family contain the highly conserved Popeye domain as the family was named for this specific protein motif.

Structure
Bves is a three-pass transmembrane protein with a short extracellular N-terminus (~40aa) and a larger intracellular C-terminus (~250aa). Within the C-terminus is the Popeye domain, which has been postulated to be important for Bves function. The Popeye domain shares no homology with any known protein motifs, and specific function of this domain is currently unknown, although it is highly conserved across species. Bves exists as a homodimer in vivo, and homodimerization has been shown to be important for function.

Localization/expression
Bves is expressed in muscle, epithelial and brain tissue, and is thus found in many adult organs. During development, Bves is detected in all three germ layers and later localizes to the aforementioned tissues. Subcellular localization is present at the plasma membrane and is also seen in punctate, intracellular vesicles. Bves demonstrates dynamic localization, dependent upon cell-cell junction formation. Prior to cell-cell contact, Bves is localized mostly to intracellular vesicles, but as cells begin to form associations, Bves is also present at points of cell-cell contact.

Interacting proteins
Bves interacts with GEFT, a protein that modulates Rho GTPases, Rac1 and Cdc42, which are important for cell motility through modulation of the actin cytoskeleton. Bves also interacts with VAMP3, a SNARE protein important for vesicle fusion. Additionally, Bves has been shown to interact with the tight junction protein, ZO1, although this interaction is most likely via a protein complex, as a direct physical interaction has never been demonstrated.

Function 

Disruption of Bves results in a wide range of cellular and developmental phenotypes. Grossly, cell motility and cell adhesion are impaired. Only recently have the molecular mechanisms underlying the function of Bves been uncovered.

Modulation of Rho GTPases 

Bves has been shown to interact and co-localize with GEFT, a modulator of Rho GTPase signaling cascades. Disruption of Bves results in decreased cell speed and increased cell roundness, which are cell processes modulated by the Rho GTPases, Rac1 and Cdc42. Accordingly, Bves disruption results in decreased active Rac1 and Cdc42. Taken together, these data demonstrate that Bves modulates Rho GTPase signaling cascades through interaction with GEFT to affect cell movement and morphology.

Regulation of vesicular transport  

Bves has been shown to interact with VAMP3, a member of the SNARE complex that facilitates vesicle fusion. VAMP3 is important for recycling of integrins during cell migration and is also necessary for exocytosis of transferrin. Upon Bves disruption, cell rounding is increased, a phenotype indicative of decreased adhesion and disruption of integrin function. Accordingly, Bves disruption results in impaired integrin recycling, phenocopying the result seen with inhibition of VAMP3. Similarly, disruption of either Bves results in impaired transferrin recycling again, mimicking the result seen with disruption of VAMP3. Thus, Bves is important for VAMP3-mediated vesicular transport underlying cell migration and transferrin recycling.

Silencing in malignancy

Bves is silenced by promoter hypermethylation in malignancy. Bves is underexpressed in colon, lung, and breast cancer. In colon cancer this occurs very early during tumorigenesis, with Bves underexpression first noted in premalignant adenomas.

References

External links